Graham Smith may refer to:

Graham Smith (activist) (born 1974), CEO of political organisation Republic
Graham Smith (photographer) (born 1947), British photographer
Graham Smith (footballer, born 1946), British footballer
Graham Smith (footballer, born 1947), British footballer & manager
Graham Smith (footballer, born 1951), British footballer
Graham Smith (soccer, born 1994), American soccer player 
Graham Smith (soccer, born 1995), American soccer player
Graham Smith (milliner) (born 1938), British milliner
Graham Smith (rower) (born 1975), British rower
Graham Smith (Canadian swimmer) (born 1958), Canadian swimmer
Graham Smith (artist), Canadian artist
Graham Smith (Bermudian swimmer) (born 1982), Bermudan swimmer
Graham Smith (Māori academic) (born 1950), New Zealand academic
Graham Smith, lead singer of Kleenex Girl Wonder
Graham David Smith (born 1937), British artist and writer
Graham M. Smith, British political theorist
Graham Smith (priest) (born 1947), former Dean of Norwich
Graham Smith, violinist in String Driven Thing and Van der Graaf
Graham Smith (Australian cricketer) (born 1964), New South Wales cricketer
Graham Smith (Durham cricketer) (1950–2012), English cricketer
Graham Smith (Leicestershire cricketer) (1923–1997), English cricketer
Graham Smith (pilot) (1919-1951), combat fighter pilot and U.S. Army Air Corps Officer with the Tuskegee Airmen

See also
George Stuart Graham-Smith (1875-1950), British pathologist and zoologist
Francis Graham-Smith (born 1923), British astronomer
Graeme Smith (disambiguation)